The 2010–11 Rugby-Bundesliga was the 40th edition of this competition and the 91st edition of the German rugby union championship. In the Rugby-Bundesliga, the first division, nine teams played a home-and-away season with a finals round between the top four teams at the end. The season started on 28 August 2010 and finish with the championship final on 28 May 2011, interrupted by a winter break from December to late February. Cold weather and heavy snow falls however meant that the last game before the winter break was played already on 6 November 2010.

The championship was won by Heidelberger RK, the defending champion, who defeated SC 1880 Frankfurt 12-9 in the final, marking the third season in a row that these two teams played each other in the championship game, being the only two professional sides in German rugby. Heidelberg had won the 2010 final while Frankfurt triumphed in 2009. It as the eighth championship for HRK. The two finalists of 2009 and 2010 are the only two clubs in Germany considered professional, the remaining clubs and players are all amateurs.

Below the Rugby-Bundesliga sits the 2nd Rugby-Bundesliga, which is divided into two divisions with ten teams each. With the RC Luxembourg, a team from Luxembourg, a non-German side competes in the league in 2010-11, the club having joined the German league system in 2009.

In the 2nd Bundesliga, TV Pforzheim won the championship and promotion without dropping a game, while northern champion TSV Victoria Linden declined promotion for a second year in a row.

Overview
The 2009-10 modus is identical to the previous season. However, the competition had been reduced from ten to nine teams, after the withdrawal of the ASV Köln Rugby during last season and no team from the 2nd Bundesliga accepting promotion. Like in 2008-09, the top four teams qualify for the finals. The two semi-finals winners then contested the championship final.

At the bottom end of the table, nominally the last two teams are relegated while the 2nd Rugby-Bundesliga champions are promoted, however, this is subject to the 2nd Bundesliga champions accepting promotion and a decision on the league strength for 2011-12. In February 2011, the DRV decided that the league would continue to play with ten teams in the future.

As a sign of the gap between the Bundesliga and the 2nd Bundesliga, TSV Victoria Linden, who only won the 2009-10 North/East division in the last round of the championship, declined promotion, citing the additional cost of travelling and the limited player pool as their reason. The South/West champion, Stuttgarter RC, also declined promotion because of the loss of eight first-team players at the end of the season, originally leaving the Bundesliga with only eight clubs for the next season. DSV 78 protested the decision to reduce the league to eight teams again and thereby relegating the club, and was ultimately permitted to stay in the league.

In the 2nd Bundesliga, SC Siemensstadt and TV Pforzheim are new teams for 2010-11, while FT Adler Kiel Rugby and RC Mainz were relegated. A third team, the Karlsruher SV Rugby, withdrew from the league during the 2009-10 season.

After suffering nine defeats in eleven games, the SC Siemensstadt withdrew its team from the North/East division of the 2nd Bundesliga in March 2011.

Bundesliga table
The final standings in the table:

Relegated: None, league expanded to ten teams in 2011-12
Promoted: TV Pforzheim

Bundesliga results
The results of the Bundesliga in 2010–11:

Key

Player statistics

Try scorers
The leading try scores in the Rugby-Bundesliga 2010–11 season were (10 tries or more):

Point scorers
The leading point scores in the 2010–11 Rugby-Bundesliga season were (100 points or more):

Per club
The top try and point scorers per club were:

Semi-finals and final

Semi-finals

Final
The 2011 final of the Rugby-Bundesliga was a closely contested game. Frankfurt lead the game from early on until almost the end of regular time. A late try by New Zealander Jesse Westerlund however equalised Frankfurt's lead, followed by a conversion by South African Pieter Jordaan. A desperate attack by Frankfurt in injury time was not rewarded and Heidelberg was able to defend its narrow lead and thereby its German title.

2nd Bundesliga tables

South/West
The final standings in the table:

Promoted to Bundesliga: TV Pforzheim
Relegated from Bundesliga: none
Relegated from 2nd Bundesliga: Stuttgarter RC, StuSta München, RG Heidelberg II1
Promoted to 2nd Bundesliga: RC Aachen, Heidelberger TV, RC Mainz
 1 Five days before the 2011-12 seasons start, the RG Heidelberg withdrew its reserve team from the 2nd Rugby-Bundesliga South/West, citing inability to guarantee a full player squad for the whole season.

North/East
The final standings in the table:

Promoted to Bundesliga: none
Relegated from Bundesliga: none
Relegated from 2nd Bundesliga: SG SV Odin/VfR Döhren2, SC Siemensstadt1
Promoted to 2nd Bundesliga: Welfen Braunschweig, Berliner SV 92
 1 SC Siemensstadt withdrew in March 2011, its record being expulsed.
 2 Team withdrew from league.

2nd Bundesliga final

References

External links
 rugbyweb.de - Rugby-Bundesliga table & results 
 Totalrugby.de - Bundesliga table & results 

2010-11
2010–11 in German rugby union
Germany
2010 in Luxembourgian sport
2011 in Luxembourgian sport